St Mary's Church is an Anglican parish church in Newton Road, Lowton, Wigan, Greater Manchester, England. It is in the deanery of Winwick, the archdeaconry of Warrington, and the diocese of Liverpool.

History

In 1850 Knott's Mill was built in the village, some distance from the nearest church of St Luke. Initially services were held in the Church Inn, and it was decided to build a church for the mill workers. It was designed by the Lancaster architect E. G. Paley, and built between 1859 and 1861 at a cost of £1,073.75. The church was consecrated on 21 November 1861 by the Bishop of Chester. It provided seating for 345 people. In 1961 to celebrate the centenary of the church, a new choir vestry was added, and was dedicated by the Bishop of Warrington.

Architecture

The church is described as being "modest". The west front contains a three-light window flanked by buttresses. Above this is an arch carrying a double bellcote. There are no aisles. The two-manual pipe organ was built in 1932 by Rushworth and Dreaper of Liverpool, and rebuilt in 1988 by David Wells, also of Liverpool.

External features

The churchyard contains the war graves of a soldier of World War I, and a soldier, an airman and a Royal Navy Captain of World War II.

See also

List of ecclesiastical works by E. G. Paley

References

Church of England church buildings in Greater Manchester
Churches completed in 1861
19th-century Church of England church buildings
Gothic Revival church buildings in England
Gothic Revival architecture in Greater Manchester
Church buildings by E. G. Paley
1861 establishments in England